Esco Micro Private Limited, is an international brand established in Singapore that develops, manufactures, and sells products and services for laboratories in over 100 countries.

Esco's products are used in academic, medical and industrial research laboratories in the pharmaceutical, biotech, chemical and food industries. They are also used in industrial laboratories where industrial process, analysis, production and quality assurance are performed.

Divisions and Products
Esco Scientific makes laboratory equipment for the clinical, research, and industrial laboratory community which includes:
- Biological Safety Cabinets
- Laminar Flow Cabinets
- Animal Research Workstations
- Ducted and Ductless Fume Hoods
- PCR Cabinets and Thermal Cycler
- General Purpose Ovens and Incubators
-  Incubators
- Laboratory Refrigerator and Freezer
- ULT Freezers

History
Esco started in 1978.

In 2000, the company's focus has shifted from cleanroom design and construction to development and sales of laboratory equipment, in particular biological safety equipment.

Under the leadership of group CEO XQ (Xiangqian) Lin, who joined the company at the age of 13 and served a key role in building the brand in life sciences industry, Esco has expanded to medical devices industry and pharmaceutical equipment industry. In recognition of Esco's contribution, Esco has won Singapore Prestige Brand Awards (SPBA) Regional Brand consecutively in 2014, 2015, and 2016.

In 2016, Esco sponsored Embryoplus in South Africa a Miri bench-top incubator to aid efforts in conservation of species that are in the brink of extinction.

References

External links

Manufacturing companies established in 1978
Companies of Singapore
Technology companies established in 1978
Singaporean brands
Singaporean companies established in 1978